Houdain is a commune in the Pas-de-Calais department in the Hauts-de-France region of France.

Geography
The small rivers Lawe and Blanche join within the commune.

Population

Places of interest
The church of St. John, dating from the thirteenth century.

Notable people
Hervé, real name Florimond Ronger, a composer, was born here in 1825.

See also
 Communes of the Pas-de-Calais department

References

External links

 Official website of Houdain 

Communes of Pas-de-Calais